"Don't Trust Me" (sometimes written as "DONTTRUSTME"), is a song by the band 3OH!3. It was released as the lead single from their second album Want on June 1, 2008.

The single was certified gold by the Recording Industry Association of America in March 2009, Platinum in April 2009, 2× platinum in July 2009, and 3× platinum on July 13, 2011.

Release 
"Don't Trust Me" was released on June 1, 2008, as the lead single for the band's label debut. "Don't Trust Me" is also featured in the game, Tap Tap Revenge for the iPhone OS. It was also used on Pretty Little Liars, The Vampire Diaries, and The Hills. The official remix features Kid Cudi.

Composition 

The song is written in the key of G minor and is set in time signature of common time with a tempo of 130 beats per minute. Foreman and Motte's vocal range spans two octaves, from F4 to D6.

Critical reception
Lou Thomas of BBC called the song "lyrically disturbing", commenting that "some might go so far as to argue it’s misogynistic and offensive".

Chart performance 
"Don't Trust Me" became the band's breakout hit. It was their first top 10 hit in the U.S, reaching #7 on the Billboard Hot 100 in its 23rd week on the chart. It has also been a huge success on U.S. Mainstream Top 40 radio, reaching #1 there. It has gone top 40 on the Canadian Hot 100 as well, at #6. "Don't Trust Me" has done particularly well in Oceania, where it has reached the top 3 in Australia, and the top 10 in New Zealand. It has also reached #5 in Finland. On July 19, 2009, the single entered the UK singles charts at #21. On April 26, 2010 "Don't Trust Me" re-entered the UK top 40 at #22.

As of June 2013, the single has sold 3,322,000 digital units in the United States.

Music video 
The official video begins with words being typed on the screen stating "A global virus of catastrophic proportions has attacked the entire male population. Only two male models from Colorado survive... this is their story". The screen shifts to a shot of the band in briefs at a photo shoot. The set resembles that of a hotel. Another photo shoot takes place at a set resembling a high school wrestling match, where they are dressed in neon-colored singlets. The last photo shoot is in the prehistoric era, and the band is dressed as cavemen. The video ends with a shot of a mushroom cloud, and the words "Transmission terminated" are typed onto the screen, followed by an apology. The video received a nomination at the 2009 MTV Video Music Awards for Best New Artist. In an interview with Paper, Nathaniel Motte discussed the video, commenting:
Yeah, being fun and weird is something we take pride in. I can remember that was the most tired I've ever been after that video shoot, we were just going crazy for 16, 18 hours. I'm not sure if there was a concept, really, it was so chaotic and all over the place. Just the raw energy and the raw strangeness.

Track listings
 Digital download
 "Don't Trust Me"  – 3:13

 CD single
 "Don't Trust Me" (Explicit Album Version) – 3:13
 "Still Around" (Remix) – 3:23

Charts

Weekly charts

Year-end charts

Certifications and sales

References 

2009 singles
3OH!3 songs
Song recordings produced by Benny Blanco
Songs written by Nathaniel Motte
2008 songs
Songs about groupies
Songs written by Sean Foreman
Songs written by Benny Blanco
Songs containing the I–V-vi-IV progression
Photo Finish Records singles